Robert Edward Newton (born July 11, 1931) was an American politician in the state of Iowa.

Newton was born in Muscatine, Iowa. He attended the University of Iowa and earned a PhD at the Catholic University of America. He is a college professor. He served in the Iowa House of Representatives from 1969 to 1971 as a Democrat.

References

1931 births
Living people
People from Muscatine, Iowa
Catholic University of America alumni
University of Iowa alumni
Educators from Iowa
Democratic Party members of the Iowa House of Representatives